Berkshire Maestros is the trading name of The Berkshire Young Musicians Trust, a musical education charity operating in Berkshire, United Kingdom.

Description
The charity's aim is to bring music to a wider audience, and encourage children to play a musical instrument, sing, or play music in a group with others.
The charity teaches over 6,000 children in schools, bands, orchestras and choirs, and has centres in Bracknell, Newbury, Windsor, Reading and Wokingham. Tuition covers a wide range of instruments, including vocals, guitar, keyboard, percussion, brass, strings and woodwind in a range of styles, and composition.

Events
In 2007, the charity's choir appeared at The Proms, and alongside Southbank Sinfonia at the Windsor Festival. In 2014, the organisation was awarded a grant from the Andrew Lloyd Webber Foundation. On 1 May 2016, around 1,500 of the Berkshire Maestros students performed a concert at the Royal Albert Hall. Primary school choirs from West Berkshire, Windsor and Maidenhead performed songs from musicals such as Mamma Mia!, Oliver! and The Jungle Book.
On 19 October 2018, the Bracknell concert band played to Elizabeth II at The Lexicon, Bracknell.

References

External links

Music charities based in the United Kingdom
Charities based in Berkshire
Music schools in England
1982 establishments in England
Organizations established in 1982